Six baronetcies have been held by the Grant family.

Colquhoun, later Grant baronets, of Grant (1625)
See Colquhoun baronets

Grant baronets, of Dalvey, Elgin (1688)

Created 10 August 1688, in the baronetage of Nova Scotia.

Sir James Grant, 1st Baronet, died 1695
Sir Ludovic Grant, 2nd Baronet, died 4 January 1701
Sir Sweton Grant, 3rd Baronet, died 1752
Sir Patrick Grant, 4th Baronet, born c. 1655, died 10 April 1755
Sir Alexander Grant, 5th Baronet (1705–1772), was member of parliament for Inverness (1761–1768)
Sir Ludovic Grant, 6th Baronet, died 17 September 1790
Sir Alexander Grant, 7th Baronet, born c. 1750, died 26 July 1825
Sir Alexander Cray Grant, 8th Baronet, born 30 November 1782, died 29 November 1854, was member of parliament for Tregony 1812–1818, Lostwithiel 1818–1826, Aldborough 1826–1830, Westbury 1830–1831 and Cambridge 1840 and again 1841–1843
Sir Robert Innes Grant, 9th Baronet, born 8 April 1794, died 1 August 1856
Sir Alexander Grant, 10th Baronet, born 23 September 1826, died 30 November 1884
Sir Ludovic James Grant, 11th Baronet, born 4 September 1862, died 11 February 1936
Sir Hamilton Grant, 12th Baronet, born 12 June 1872, died 23 January 1937
Sir Duncan Alexander Grant, 13th Baronet, born 16 December 1928, died 25 March 1961
Sir Patrick Alexander Benedict Grant, 14th Baronet, born 5 February 1953

Grant baronets, of Monymusk, Aberdeen (1705)

Created 7 December 1705, in the baronetage of Nova Scotia.
Sir Francis Grant, 1st Baronet, born 1658, died 23 March 1726
Sir Archibald Grant, 2nd Baronet, born 25 September 1696, died 17 September 1778, was member of parliament for Aberdeenshire 1722–1732
Sir Archibald Grant, 3rd Baronet, born 17 February 1731, died 30 September 1796
Sir Archibald Grant, 4th Baronet, born 7 May 1760, died 17 April 1820
Sir James Grant, 5th Baronet, born 17 February 1791, died 30 August 1859
Sir Isaac Grant, 6th Baronet, born 5 July 1792, died 19 July 1863
Sir Archibald Grant, 7th Baronet, born 21 September 1823, died 5 September 1884
Sir Francis William Grant, 8th Baronet, born 10 February 1828, died 13 December 1887
Sir Arthur Henry Grant, 9th Baronet, born 24 April 1849, died 1 March 1917
Sir Arthur Grant, 10th Baronet, born 14 September 1879, died 21 June 1931
Sir Arthur Lindsay Grant, 11th Baronet, born 8 September 1911, died 18 July 1944, m. Priscilla Buchan, Baroness Tweedsmuir
Sir Francis Cullen Grant, 12th Baronet, born 5 October 1914, died 31 August 1966
Sir Archibald Grant, 13th Baronet, born 2 September 1954

Grant baronets, of Forres, Moray (1924)

Created 25 June 1924, in the baronetage of the United Kingdom.

Sir Alexander Grant, 1st Baronet, born 1 October 1864, died 21 May 1937
Sir Robert McVitie Grant, 2nd Baronet, born 7 December 1894, died 26 January 1947, when the baronetcy became extinct due to no heir.

Grant baronet, of Househill, Nairn (1926)

Created 30 July 1926, a baronetage of the United Kingdom.

Sir James Augustus Grant, 1st Baronet, born 3 March 1867, was member of parliament for Egremont 1910–1918, for Whitehaven 1918–1922, and Derbyshire South 1924–1929. He had no son and died on 29 July 1932, when the title became extinct.

Macpherson-Grant baronets, of Ballindalloch (1838)
 See Macpherson-Grant baronets

References

Baronetcies in the Baronetage of Nova Scotia
Extinct baronetcies in the Baronetage of the United Kingdom
1688 establishments in Nova Scotia
1924 establishments in the United Kingdom